Lobachsville is an unincorporated community in Pike Township in Berks County, Pennsylvania, United States. Lobachsville is located at the intersection of Lobachsville Road and Bertolet Mill Road/Long Lane.

References

Unincorporated communities in Berks County, Pennsylvania
Unincorporated communities in Pennsylvania